Angiokeratoma is a benign cutaneous lesion of capillaries, resulting in small marks of red to blue color and characterized by hyperkeratosis. Angiokeratoma corporis diffusum refers to Fabry's disease, but this is usually considered a distinct condition.

Signs and symptoms

Presentation includes telangiectasia, acanthosis, and hyperkeratosis.

Presentation can be solitary or systemic.

Multiple angiokeratomas, especially on the trunk in young people, are typical for Fabry disease, genetic disorder connected with systemic complications.

Complications
In some instances nodular angiokeratomas can produce necrotic tissue and valleys that can harbor fungal, bacterial and viral infections.  Infections can include staphylococcus.  If the lesion becomes painful, begins draining fluids or pus, or begins to smell, consult a physician.  In these instance a doctor may recommend excision and grafting.

Pathophysiology

Histology
Angiokeratomas characteristically have large dilated blood vessels in the superficial dermis and hyperkeratosis (overlying the dilated vessels).

Diagnosis
Due to the rarity of different types of vascular conditions, angiokeratomas may be misdiagnosed.  A biopsy of the lesion can produce a more accurate diagnosis.

Classification
Angiokeratoma may be classified as:
 Angiokeratoma of Mibelli (also known as "Mibelli's angiokeratoma," "Telangiectatic warts") consists of 1- to 5-mm red vascular papules, the surfaces of which become hyperkeratotic in the course of time. The disease is named after Italian dermatologist Vittorio Mibelli (1860-1910).
 Angiokeratoma of Fordyce (also known as "Angiokeratoma of the scrotum and vulva," though not to be confused with Fordyce's spots) is a skin condition characterized by red to blue papules on the scrotum or vulva.
 Solitary angiokeratoma is a small, bluish-black, warty papule that occurs predominantly on the lower extremities.
 Verrucous vascular malformation (also known as "Angiokeratoma circumscriptum naeviforme") is a malformation of dermal and subcutaneous capillaries and veins, a congenital vascular malformation, which, over time, a verrucous component appears.

Treatment
Outpatient treatments such as interventional radiology, lasers, and physical therapy are employed to reduce the severity of the vascular lesions.  However, in some cases lasers have caused a reaction in the tissue causing it to expand and become exposed to infection.  Excision and grafting may be necessary to remove the lesion.  Recovery time on such an operation ranges from 3 to 12 weeks depending on location of the graft, healing time and the possibility of complications.

See also 
 Fabry disease
 List of cutaneous conditions

References

External links 

Dermal and subcutaneous growths